Syeda Rizwana Hasan (born 15 January 1968) is a Bangladeshi attorney and environmentalist. She has particularly focused on regulations for the shipbreaking industry in Bangladesh, and was awarded the Goldman Environmental Prize in 2009. She was also awarded the Ramon Magsaysay Award in 2012 for her "uncompromising courage and impassioned leadership in a campaign of judicial activism in Bangladesh that affirms the people's right to a good environment as nothing less than their right to dignity and life."

Early life and education
Syeda Rizwana Hasan was born on 15 January 1968, into a Bengali Muslim family of Syeds in Habiganj District, East Pakistan (now Bangladesh). She attended Viqarunnisa Noon School and College for her secondary education and Holy Cross College for her higher secondary education, before attending Dhaka University for her bachelor's and master's degree in law.

Career
Hasan got involved in the shipbreaking industry, first suing the breaking yards in Chittagong in 2003 for, among other reasons, bringing health hazards to the workers, poor working conditions, and improper waste disposal. In response, in March 2003 the court declared shipbreaking without an environmental clearance from the appropriate department illegal. Hasan continues to strive for more labour rights and a safer working environment in the industry. She has also successfully sued organizations involved in filling lakes to build real estate, the improper use of polythene, hill cutting, deforestation, shrimp farming, and building illegal establishments on St. Martin's Island.

Awards
Under Hasan's leadership, BELA won the Global 500 Roll of Honor in 2003 by the United Nations Environment Program. She herself won:
The Inaugural Environment Award in 2007, by the Ministry of Forestry and Environment, Government of Bangladesh, for raising environmental awareness.
Celebrating Womenhood Award in 2008 by the Nepal-based Creative Statements and South Asia Partnership
The Goldman Environmental Prize in 2009.
The Ramon Magsaysay Award in 2012

She has also been dubbed as a Hero of Environment by the American news magazine TIME.

In 2022, Hasan received the International Women of Courage Award from the United States Department of State.

Personal life
Hasan was born in Habiganj to the parents Syed Mahibul Hasan and Suraiya Hasan. She married her classmate lawyer-entrepreneur Abu Bakar Siddique, and has a daughter, Nehla Siddique and two sons, Ahmed Zarir Siddique and Ahmed Zeedan Siddique. In April 2014, her husband Siddique, Managing Director of a garment factory owned by Nasrul Hamid Bipu, was briefly abducted by unknown individuals.

Selected works
 Laws & decision on compensation in Bangladesh, 2001
 Judicial decisions on environment in South Asia : up to 2000, 2005
 Judicial decisions on environment in South Asia, 2001-2004, 2006
 Supreme Court on wetland conservation, 2014

References

1968 births
Living people
People from Dhaka
People from Habiganj District
Bangladeshi environmentalists
Bangladeshi non-fiction writers
Bangladeshi women writers
Non-fiction environmental writers
University of Dhaka alumni
20th-century Bangladeshi lawyers
21st-century Bangladeshi lawyers
Holy Cross College, Dhaka alumni
Goldman Environmental Prize awardees
Bangladeshi people of Arab descent
Recipients of the International Women of Courage Award
Bangladeshi women lawyers